Stergios Felegakis (born 24 April 1986 in Rodos, Greece) is a professional football defender.
Felegakis started his career from the Panathinaikos FC academy.  After one year on loan at Koropi F.C., he was transferred to Panetolikos F.C., where he played for two years in the Greek third division.

In the summer of 2009, Felegakis transferred to Aittitos Spata.

See also 
Football in Greece
List of football clubs in Greece

References

External links 
 http://www.panetolikos.gr/

1986 births
Living people
Greek footballers
Panetolikos F.C. players
Association football defenders
People from Rhodes
Sportspeople from the South Aegean